Pooja Sharma may refer to:
Pooja Sharma (entrepreneur) Indian businessperson who empowered women 
Pooja Sharma (Indian actress) (born 1989), Indian model and TV actress
Pooja Sharma (Nepalese actress) (born 1992), Nepalese actress, film producer and singer
Pooja Sharma (kabaddi) (born 1984), Indian kabaddi player
Pooja Sharma, a character in Vaada
Pooja Sharma, a character in Kabhi Khushi Kabhie Gham...